The Akademisches Gymnasium is a coeducational gymnasium grammar school located in Graz, Styria, Austria. Founded in 1573 by Charles II, Archduke of Austria, it is the oldest secondary school in Graz.

Overview 
Akademisches Gymnasium Graz teaches modern languages situated providing also Latin and optional Greek, as regular school subjects. On average there are 24 classes, some 550 students and about 60 teachers.

The school's main aim is to develop the students' potential to the full and to help them grow into successful, caring and respectful young people. In order to achieve this, Akademisches provides corporate teamwork (learners/teachers/parents/administration) and a safe, supportive environment for students within which their academic, cultural and emotional needs are met, sometimes even beyond the statutory curriculum.

Not only with its course system in upper forms can students set their own priorities in their school careers (science, languages etc.) but also by taking part in school partnerships, trips abroad, cooperation with universities, competitions on all levels, school projects, artistic activities, exhibitions, social projects and lots more.

Specially trained teachers assist gifted and talented students in developing their skills. Furthermore, there is a day-care facility for students aged 10 to 14 until 5 p.m. They receive professional help with their homework, but there is also room for individual activities.

See also
 List of Jesuit educational institutions

References

Further reading 
 Year books: Jahresberichte des Akademischen Gymnasiums Graz. Hrsg.: Akademisches Gymnasium Graz. Selbstverlag des Akademischen Gymnasiums Graz. Graz, jährliches Erscheinen.
 400 Jahre Akademisches Gymnasium in Graz 1573–1973. Festschrift. Verlag des Akademischen Gymnasiums in Graz, Graz 1973.

External links 

 Website Akademisches Gymnasium Graz

Schools in Graz
Jesuit schools in Austria
Educational institutions established in the 1570s
Gymnasiums in Austria
1573 establishments in Austria
Establishments in the Duchy of Styria